Global Warming: What You Need to Know is a 2006 global warming (climate change) documentary, directed by Nicolas Brown, starring Tom Brokaw, James Hansen, Michael Oppenheimer, and Mark Serreze. The film focuses on impacts from climate change, and Tom Brokaw interviews scientists. The documentary premiered on Discovery Channel, 16 July 2006.

References

External links
IMDB Page

2006 films
2006 in the environment
2006 documentary films
Documentary films about global warming
2000s English-language films